The Dixie Plantation is a Southern plantation with a historic house located in Franklin, Louisiana, USA.

History
The two-story mansion was built for Hilarie Carlin circa 1835. It was acquired by Richard A. Wilkins in 1846. Wilkins's sister, Sally, married George Pickett in this house in 1851; he later served as a general in the Confederate States Army during the American Civil War of 1861–1865.

In 1883, it was purchased by Murphy J. Foster, who served as the 31st Governor of Louisiana from 1892 to 1900. It was inherited by his granddaughter, Mrs Langfitt Bowditch Wilby.

Architectural significance
It has been listed on the National Register of Historic Places since May 29, 1987.

References

Plantation houses in Louisiana
Houses in St. Mary Parish, Louisiana
Houses on the National Register of Historic Places in Louisiana
National Register of Historic Places in St. Mary Parish, Louisiana